Palghar taluka is a taluka in Palghar district of Maharashtra an Indian state.

Thane district
On 1 August 2014,  the talukas of Mokhada, Jawahar, Talasari, Vikramgadh, Wada, Dahanu, Palghar and Vasai were separated from the erstwhile Thane district to form a new district Palghar. 
Mr. Maheyssh Sagar is current Tahsildar & Executive Magistrate of Taluka Palghar. Mr. Vikas M. Gajare is current Sub Divisional Officer & Sub Divisional Magistrate of Palghar Sub Division.

References

Talukas in Maharashtra
Talukas in Palghar district